Interstate 44 (I-44) in the US state of Texas has a short, but regionally important,  stretch connecting Wichita Falls with Oklahoma. Its entire length runs concurrently with U.S. Highway 277 (US 277) and US 281. I-44 provides access to downtown Wichita Falls and Sheppard Air Force Base. I-44 is known as Central Freeway in Wichita Falls and Red River Expressway in Burkburnett.

Route description
I-44 begins near exit 1 in Wichita Falls concurrent with US 277, US 281, and US 287. US 281 and US 287 continue to the south while US 277 leaves the concurrency at exit 1, which also provides access to US 82. I-44 heads north through Wichita Falls to an interchange with US 287 and State Highway Spur 325 (Spur 325). US 287 leaves the concurrency as a freeway to the west while Spur 325 leaves the interchange toward the northeast, providing access to Sheppard Air Force Base and Wichita Falls Municipal Airport. I-44 continues to the north as it leaves the Wichita Falls city limits at Bacon Switch Road. The freeway enters the Burkburnett city limits south of an interchange at Farm to Market Road 3429 (FM 3429). Heading north through the city, I-44 has an interchange with State Highway 240 (SH 240). After passing SH 240, I-44 begins to head toward the northeast before its final interchange in Texas at East 3rd Street. I-44 leaves the state of Texas at its crossing of the Red River and enters Oklahoma.

History

I-44 was signed south from Oklahoma City past I-40, along the H. E. Bailey Turnpike, in 1982. This additional signage included the Red River Expressway in Burkburnett and the Central Freeway in Wichita Falls, to 8th Street (being concurrent with US 277/US 281/US 287). For many years, the freeway ended here, forcing traffic to exit onto the service roads. In the early 2000s, the Central Freeway was extended through the downtown area, connecting directly to the Central East Freeway via the Lloyd Ruby Overpass.

Exit list

Notes

References

Texas
44
Transportation in Wichita County, Texas